Community Behavioral Health (often initialized as CBH) is a 501(c)(3) non-profit corporation headquartered in Philadelphia, Pennsylvania. As a behavioral health Medicaid managed care organization, CBH is contracted by the city of Philadelphia to manage the delivery and payment of mental health and substance use services to Philadelphia's Medicaid recipients. It is a component of and works in tandem with the city's Department of Behavioral Health and Intellectual disAbility Services (DBHIDS).

History and Operations 
CBH was founded in 1997 and has grown steadily since that time. In 2017, over 700,000 Philadelphians were eligible for Medicaid; of these, over 100,000 used services covered by CBH. Total expenditures for those services totaled to over $740,000,000. Its 2018 budget was over $900,000,000—with additional assets totaling over $160,000,000—placing it in the top eleven Philadelphia non-profits by income. Pew Charitable Trusts notes that CBH is one of the largest contracted recipients of city funds in Philadelphia.

At the end of 2018, CBH extended a tobacco-free policy to all inpatient substance use treatment centers in Philadelphia. This policy raised objections from local advocates, who claimed it increased the rate of treatment drop-out.

Faith Dyson-Washington is the current CEO. She was selected as chief executive officer of Community Behavioral Health on October 12, 2020.

External links
 

501(c)(3) organizations
Non-profit organizations based in Philadelphia
1997 establishments in Pennsylvania
Health care companies based in Pennsylvania